Rudolf of St Trond (also Rodulf, Rodolfus, Rodolphe, Radulphus, Rudolph, or Raoul, c. 1070–1138) was a Benedictine abbot of St Trond Abbey, chronicler and composer.

A musical treatise Quaestiones in musica was attributed to him by the musicologist Rudolf Steglich; another suggestion is Franco of Liège.

He wrote a chronicle Gesta Abbatum Trudonensium, on the abbots of his abbey, beginning in 999; it is included in the Paleographie musicale and the Monumenta Germaniae Historica. His description of monastic life includes details of musical practice and training methods of Guido of Arezzo. Historian Henri de Lubac wrote that he showed "a very exacting and almost combative idea of historical truth."

Notes

External links
 musicologie.org page

1138 deaths
Belgian Benedictines
12th-century composers
Year of birth uncertain
Benedictine abbots
Belgian male classical composers
Medieval male composers
12th-century people of the Holy Roman Empire